Piotr Mateusz Andrzej Cywiński (born 16 April 1972 in Warsaw) is a professional historian and Director of the Auschwitz-Birkenau State Museum since 2006; an active participant and frequent initiator in the Polish-Jewish and Christian-Jewish dialogue; and an ecumenist devoted to reconciliation of the various denominations among the cultures of the Kresy borderlands.

Life
Cywiński spent his childhood in Warsaw. Between 1982 and 1993 he lived in Switzerland and France due to the political exile of his father :pl:Bohdan Cywiński who is a philosopher, historian and journalist. His mother Maria-Malgorzata is a daughter of the artist :pl:Zbigniew Łoskot.

Cywiński graduated from the Université des sciences humaines in Strasbourg (1993) as a historian of the Middle Ages, and the Catholic University of Lublin (1995). He obtained his PhD degree at the Institute of History of the Polish Academy of Sciences (PAS) in 2001.

Professional career
In 1996–2000 Piotr Cywiński served as vice-president of the Club of Catholic Intelligentsia (KIK) in Warsaw, followed by ten years as the President. Since 2010 he has been a Board Member of KIK.

In 2002 he co-founded the multicultural St. Adalbert's Forum, which he chaired for approximately eight years. He co-organized the Congresses of Gniezno in 2003, 2004 and 2005. In 2004 Cywiński was elected vice-president (and regional president for Europe) of the global federation of Catholic intellectuals Pax Romana ICMICA/MIIC for the mandate 2004–2008.

Between 2000 and 2006 Cywiński served as Secretary for the International Auschwitz Council (IAC). On 12 June 2006 Cywiński was nominated for director of the Auschwitz-Birkenau State Museum, a position he assumed on 1 September that year, replacing Jerzy Wróblewski  who had been the director since 1990. He was also co-creator of the International Centre for Education about Auschwitz and the Holocaust and vice president of the center's council. In 2009 Cywiński co-created the Auschwitz-Birkenau Foundation and since then serves as president of the foundation.

For the years 2009-2018 Cywiński has been a member of the Museums' Council to the Minister of Culture (mandate IV and V), and in 2010 was appointed as member of the Council for the Protection of Struggle and Martyrdom Sites. He also serves as vice-president of the Council of :pl:Muzeum Tradycji Niepodległościowych w Łodzi, and member of the first mandate of the council, later - since 2012 - as member of the Board of Trustees of the Museum of World War II in Gdańsk. He is a member of the Council of Museum Gross-Rosen in Rogoźnica.

He is a council member of the :de:Maximilian-Kolbe-Werk, a charity for concentration camp survivors. In 2011 he became a board member of the Association Maison d’Izieu, memorial site in France. In 2015 the board of the Memorial Association accepted him as member of the Moscow's Memorial Association.

In 2000-2002 while working for the Adam Mickiewicz Institute, Cywiński co-directed the Festival "Europalia 2001 Poland", then created a portal about Jewish culture and history in Poland: "Diapozytyw.pl". In 2001-2004 he was a member of the Consultative Council of NGOs at the Polish Council for European Integration. For the years 2002-2014 he served as a member of the Polish Episcopate's Group for Dialogue with the Greek Catholic Church in Ukraine.

In the 2004 European Parliament election, he was a candidate on behalf of the Freedom Union. Between 2005 and 2007, Piotr Cywiński was vice-president of the association Wikimedia Poland, since May 2007 he is a member of the Audit Committee of the association.

In 2008, Cywiński served as ambassador of the European Year of Intercultural Dialogue.

Honors and awards
Piotr Cywiński was awarded the Gold Cross of Merit in 2006. On 15 April 2008 Lech Kaczyński, the President of Poland, awarded Cywiński the Knight's Cross of the Order of Polonia Restituta.  Also in that year, he was nominated to the TOTUS Award in the category of "achievements in the field of Christian culture”. On 20 January 2010, he received the Officer's Cross of the Polonia Restituta.

In June 2012 he was awarded the Belgian Order of the Crown. In November 2012, prince Albert II of Monaco awarded Piotr Cywiński the knight class of the Order of Saint-Charles. In 2014 he received the Officer's Cross of the Order of the Phoenix (Greece) and in 2015 the Knight's Cross Order of Academic Palms (France).

In 2013 the Polish Minister of Foreign Affairs awarded him the Bene Merito honorary badge for his activities in strengthening the position of Poland in the international arena. In 2014 he received the Golden Order for Achievements in the Penitentiary Work from the Polish Minister of Justice (and also from the Polish Ombudsman's Award for Human Rights' Protection). In 2015  he received a Silver Gloria Artis Award from the Minister of Culture and in 2019 the Knight medal insignia of the French Legion of Honour.

Selected publications 
 Kościół wobec integracji europejskiej [co-author], ed. Jan Grosfeld, Warszawa 1997, .
 L'Église en Pologne après 1989 face aux nouveaux défis de la démocratie avec Marcin Przeciszewski, Volume 48 de Cahier / le Rayonnement culturel polonais, in Communio : revue catholique internationale, 179, Vol. XXX, 2005
 Mój Auschwitz [co-author of interview with Władysław Bartoszewski], ZNAK, Kraków 2010, .
 Guide historique d’Auschwitz [introduction], Jean-Francois Forges, Pierre-Jerome Biscarat, Autrement, Paris 2011, .
 Le futur d’Auschwitz. Actes de la journee d’etude du 11 mai 2010 [co-author], IRICE (Sorbone, Paris IV, CNRS et al.), cahier 7: Paris 2011, ISSN 1967-2713.
 Auschwitz-Birkenau. The Place Where You Are Standing [author of concept and introduction], Auschwitz-Birkenau State Museum, Oświęcim 2012, .
 Epitaph, Auschwitz-Birkenau State Museum, Oświęcim 2012, .
 Auschwitz from A to Z. An Illustrated History of the Camp [co-author], Auschwitz-Birkenau State Museum, Oświęcim 2013, .
 Początki Auschwitz w pamięci pierwszego transportu polskich więźniów politycznych, Auschwitz-Birkenau State Museum, Oświęcim 2015, .
 Auschwitz Legacies [co-author], Auschwitz-Birkenau State Museum, Oświęcim 2015, .
 Auschwitz. A Monograph on the Human, Auschwitz-Birkenau State Museum, Oświęcim 2022, .
 Auschwitz Bauleitung. Designing a Death Camp. Projektowanie Obozu Śmierci, Auschwitz-Birkenau State Museum, Oświęcim 2023 .

References

Ambassador Portrait "Phd. Piotr M. A. Cywiński". 
Official personal website "Piotr M. A. Cywiński".

External links 

 Private website by/of Piotr M. A. Cywiński
 Official website of Auschwitz-Birkenau Memorial Site/State Museum
 European Commission: European Year of Intercultural Dialogue Overview
 2008 European Year of Intercultural Dialogue (official website) national ambassadors

1972 births
Living people
21st-century Polish historians
Polish male non-fiction writers
Polish medievalists
Polish Roman Catholics
Writers from Warsaw
Directors of museums in Poland
Officers of the Order of Polonia Restituta
Polish Wikimedians
Recipients of the Gold Cross of Merit (Poland)
Recipients of the Cross of the Order of Merit of the Federal Republic of Germany
Knights of the Order of Saint-Charles
Knights of the Order of the Crown (Belgium)
Chevaliers of the Légion d'honneur
Historians of the Holocaust in Poland